The Prey is a 2018 US-Cambodian film directed and written by Jimmy Henderson and "trumpeted as Cambodia’s first million-dollar action movie".

Synopsis 
Xin, an undercover Interpol operative who is investigating a phone scam that is spreading in China and seems to be based in Phnom Penh. When Cambodian Police raids the operation’s headquarter and arrest everybody, Xin has to go along with it in order to keep his cover. The bunch of arrested criminals are sent to a forgotten prison at the border, governed by a ruthless and sadistic warden. Xin manages to send a signal to his boss in Beijing, just in time before being labeled as a trouble-maker and consequently sent with a group of other unlucky fellow prisoners to a mysterious mission in the jungle.

Reception 
The Prey debuted at the Busan International Film Festival in 2018. The Prey has been described as a "scrappy yet satisfying low-budget action movie in a country where the genre has been all but nonexistent."

It was Jimmy Henderson's second collaboration which Dy Sonita, since Jailbreak, which sent the latter into stardom in Cambodia.

The film which includes many fights scenes was appreciated for its support in preserving the fighting art of bokator.

Cast 
The movie has a multi-national cast of actors and actresses from Cambodia, Thailand and China.

 Gu Shangwei, as Xin
 Vithaya Pansringarm
 Byron Bishop
 Nophand Boonyai
 Rous Mony
 Dy Sonita

References

External links 

 
 

2018 films
2018 action films
Cambodian drama films
2010s English-language films